Carodista liui is a moth in the family Lecithoceridae. It was described by Chun-Sheng Wu in 2002. It is found in Beijing, China.

The species is related to Carodista gracilis, but can be distinguished by the male genitalia.

References

Moths described in 2002
Carodista